Holland & Knight LLP is an American multinational law firm with more than 1,700 lawyers and other professionals in 35 offices in the United States, Europe, Latin America, and North Africa. Headquartered in Tampa, Florida, the firm provides representation in litigation, business, real estate, construction law, intellectual property and governmental law. It is one of the largest law firms in the world by revenue and attorney count. Holland & Knight specializes in representing major Fortune 50 companies and corporations globally.

Office locations 
Holland & Knight has offices in the United States, Colombia, England, Mexico and Algeria.

History

Predecessor firms
The Knight firm was founded in  1889 in Tampa, Florida. The Holland firm was established in 1919 in Polk County, Florida. In 1968, the two merged to form Holland & Knight.

Major Principals
   Spessard Holland received a law degree from  the University of Florida Law School in 1916; in addition to his work as a lawyer, he was Governor of Florida (1941–1945) and U.S. Senator from Florida (1946–1971). He  practiced law until his death in November 1971.

Peter O. Knight graduated from Valparaiso University Law School in 1884 In addition to his work as a lawyer, he served in the Florida Legislature and founded both TECO Energy and a major bank.  He died in 1946.
 
Chesterfield Smith was managing partner of the combined firm until 1983. He was president of The Florida Bar in 1964-65 and president of the American Bar Association (ABA) in 1973-74. He served as Chairman of the Florida Constitutional Revision Commission.

Selected moments 
 1889 	Peter O. Knight established his practice
 1919 	Senator Spessard Holland established his practice
 1968	Two Florida practices merge to create Holland & Knight LLP
 1973-74 The late Chesterfield Smith, Chairman Emeritus, served as ABA President
 1982 	Opened first office outside of Florida in Washington, D.C.
 1994	Established presence in Atlanta, GA
 1997 	Entered New York and San Francisco markets by acquiring Haight Gardner Poor & Havens
 1998 	Joint venture with a Mexico City law firm and established Boston office
 2000 	Opened Midwest office in Chicago and second West Coast office in Los Angeles
 2001 	Pacific Northwest presence with an office in Portland, OR
 2004 	Expanded overseas into Beijing, China

Community commitment

Political contributions
According to OpenSecrets, Holland & Knight was one of the top law firms contributing to federal candidates during the 2012 election cycle, donating $1.19 million, 59% to Democrats.  By comparison, during that same period Akin Gump Strauss Hauer & Feld donated $2.56 million, 66% to Democrats, while oil conglomerate ExxonMobil donated $2.66 million, 88% to Republicans.  Since 1990, Holland & Knight has contributed $10.47 million to federal campaigns, and spent over $1 million on lobbying since 2001.

Pro bono work
Holland & Knight is known for representing people with legal problems who otherwise would have been denied access to the legal system. Some of their pro bono clients have included:

 Wilbert Rideau, a prisoner who spent 44 years in jail until he was freed through a jury verdict
 Haitian victims of torture, arbitrary detention, extrajudicial killing, and crimes against humanity for whom the firm obtained a $4.3 million federal jury verdict
 Mohammed Al Rehaief, an American hero who, with his family, helped save POW Jessica Lynch in Iraq
 African-American survivors of Rosewood, a town destroyed in 1923 by white neighbors
 Prisoners with HIV/AIDS in Alabama facing life-threatening conditions and treatment
 Death row inmates experiencing deplorable conditions of confinement in Mississippi

Charitable work
Charitable giving is managed and coordinated by the Holland & Knight Charitable Foundation (GuideStar Profile), which was established as a 501(c)(3) public charity in 1996. The foundation underwrites several programs that support education, including the Opening Doors for Children reading program, the Holocaust Remembrance Project national essay contest, Young Native Writers Essay Contest for Native American high school students, and the Dream Scholarship Essay Contest designed to honor the legacy of Dr. Martin Luther King Jr. Prior winners of the Young Native Writers Essay Contest were featured in Indian Country Today.

Chesterfield Smith Ceremonial Classroom
The Chesterfield Smith Ceremonial Classroom at the University of Florida Levin College of Law was dedicated on Sept. 21, 2006, by a distinguished group of friends and colleagues of the legendary Chesterfield Smith: U.S. Supreme Court Associate Justice Ruth Bader Ginsburg, UF President Bernie Machen, Levin College of Law Dean Robert Jerry, then Holland & Knight Managing Partner Howell W. Melton Jr., and Holland & Knight partner and then chair of the firm's Directors Committee Martha Barnett. Smith graduated from the law school in 1948.

Awards
 The firm received national first-tier rankings in the 2013 U.S. News – Best Lawyers Best Law Firms guide in 22 practice areas.
 More than 130 Holland & Knight attorneys were named in the Chambers USA 2013 guide.
 Corporate Counsel magazine named Holland & Knight a "2012 Go-To Law Firm" for the top 500 U.S. companies.
 Holland & Knight ranks among the top-performing law firms that provide superior client service, according to 2013 BTI Consulting Group's annual survey of corporate counsel and C-level executives.
 Holland & Knight was named one of the world's top trademark law firms in the World Trademark Review 1000 – The Definitive Guide to Trademark Legal Services.
 Directors & Boards magazine ranked Holland & Knight the nation's top law firm for dealing with director liability issues.
 The firm was named the Law Firm of the Year in the Washington, D.C., area by the Greater Washington Commercial Association of Realtors three times in the past five years.
 Former Congressman Gerry Sikorski, Richard Gold, and Kathryn Hazeem Lehman were recognized by The Hill as Washington, D.C.'s Top Lobbyists.

Diversity

 Working Mother magazine and Flex-Time Lawyers named Holland & Knight one of 50 "2012 Best Law Firms for Women".
 The firm earned Gold Standard Certification from The Women in Law Empowerment Forum (WILEF) p.
 The firm ranked third in The American Lawyer magazine's 2012 Diversity Scorecard for the number of Hispanic attorneys.
 The firm was awarded the "Michael K. Reese Quality of Life Award" by The Florida Bar Young Lawyers Division.

See also 
Fisher Potter Hodas
Broad and Cassel

References

External links 
 
Chambers and Partners Firm Profile
 

 
Law firms established in 1968
Law firms based in Florida
1968 establishments in Florida